Charles Morris Young (September 23, 1869 – November 14, 1964) was an American painter. His work was part of the art competitions at the 1928 Summer Olympics and the 1932 Summer Olympics.

References

1869 births
1964 deaths
20th-century American painters
20th-century American male artists
American male painters
Olympic competitors in art competitions
People from Gettysburg, Pennsylvania